Lithophane consocia, the scarce conformist or Softly's shoulder-knot, is a moth of the family Noctuidae. The species was first described by Moritz Balthasar Borkhausen in 1792. It is found throughout northern, central and eastern Europe, east to Siberia. There is a single record from Great Britain, where it was recorded in Hampstead, London, in September 2001.

The wingspan is 43–48 mm. Seitz describes it - L. ingrica H.-Sch. (= conformis Frr. nec Hbn., cinerosa Guen.). Forewing silvery grey, more
or less overlaid with purplish brown; the pale patch at base of costa, and the pale rings of the stigmata distinguish it at once from furcifera; all the markings, both lines and stigmata, are more conspicuous: grisea Graes. (= obscura Carad.) is a dark form from Amurland ; basidiluta Strand from Norway and St. Petersburg
has the whole basal area paler. Larva grey brown with velvety black interrupted
dorsal, subdorsal, and spiracular lines, mixed with yellow and red.
Adults are on wing from September and overwintering until May.

The larvae feed on Alnus and Corylus.

Subspecies
Lithophane consocia consocia (Europe)
Lithophane consocia grisea (south-eastern Siberia)

References

External links

Fauna Europaea
Lepiforum e.V.

consocia
Moths described in 1792
Moths of Japan
Moths of Europe
Taxa named by Moritz Balthasar Borkhausen